Petar Sibinkić (born January 10, 1976, in Novi Sad) is a Yugoslav-born retired Serbian and Bulgarian sprint canoer who competed from the mid-1990s to the early 2000s. Competing for FR Yugoslavia, he was eliminated in the repechages of the K-1 500 m event at the 1996 Summer Olympics in Atlanta. Four years later in Sydney, Sibinkić finished fifth in the K-2 1000 m and eighth in the K-4 1000 m event while competing for Bulgaria.

References
 

1976 births
Bulgarian male canoeists
Serbian male canoeists
Canoeists at the 1996 Summer Olympics
Canoeists at the 2000 Summer Olympics
Living people
Olympic canoeists of Bulgaria
Olympic canoeists of Yugoslavia
Yugoslav male canoeists
Sportspeople from Novi Sad